Pirkko Länsivuori (1 June 1926 – 15 January 2012) was a Finnish sprinter. She competed in the women's 200 metres at the 1952 Summer Olympics.

References

External links
 

1926 births
2012 deaths
Athletes (track and field) at the 1952 Summer Olympics
Finnish female sprinters
Olympic athletes of Finland
Place of birth missing
Olympic female sprinters